The following major military operations have sometimes been unofficially referred as Eleven Days War or Eleven Day War:

Operation Faustschlag, a 1918 Central Powers offensive against  Soviet Russia during World War I
Operation Linebacker II, a 1972 United States bombing campaign against North Vietnam during Vietnam War.
Operation Guardian of the Walls, part of the 2021 Israel–Palestine crisis.

See also
 Eleven Days (disambiguation)